George Washington (3 January 2003 – 27 October 2007) was a thoroughbred racehorse foaled in Ireland by champion sire Danehill out of Bordighera. Bred by Roy and Gretchen Jackson, he was trained at Ballydoyle by Aidan O'Brien and owned by Susan Magnier, Michael Tabor and Derrick Smith. The horse won two Group One races in England in 2006 before being sent to stud, where he suffered fertility problems. He was brought back to racing in 2007 but suffered a dislocated ankle fracture during the Breeders' Cup Classic at Monmouth Park on 27 October 2007 and was euthanised. The horse was nicknamed 'Gorgeous George' by his followers.

Two-year-old career 

George Washington's debut was in a maiden race during the 2,000 Guineas meeting at Newmarket on 1 May 2005. He finished third behind League Champion over 5 furlongs (1,006 m).

Victory followed in his second race at the Curragh three weeks later, this time over 6 furlongs (1207 m). Another win came in the Group II Railway Stakes, again over 6 furlongs (1207 m) at the Curragh.

The Group I Phoenix Stakes was next on the agenda, and George Washington won by 8 lengths from his stablemate Amadeus Mozart, despite having been slightly hampered at the start.

His final race as a two-year-old was in the National Stakes in September, another Group 1, which he won by 2 lengths as a long odds-on favourite. Although he was declared to run in the Dewhurst Stakes the following month, he was withdrawn just minutes before the race after the ground was deemed unsuitable.

For his performances, George Washington was voted the 2005 Cartier Award for Two-Year-Old European Champion Colt.

Three-year-old career 

The 2,000 Guineas at Newmarket was his first outing of the season. Aidan O'Brien was attempting to win the race for a fourth time, having previously won with King of Kings in 1998, Rock of Gibraltar in 2002, and Footstepsinthesand in 2005. The horse started as 6/4 favourite and won, beating subsequent Epsom Derby winner Sir Percy by 2½ lengths.

Breakdown of 2000 Guineas Stakes Race performances since the race

In the Irish 2,000 Guineas, George Washington finished second, beaten two lengths by subsequent dual-Group 1 winner Araafa, who had been fourth at Newmarket. The horse's finishing acceleration was blunted by the heavy ground conditions, and following the race it emerged that he had torn his foreleg.

Due to the 2,000 Guineas form holding up, George Washington's rating was raised and his run in the 2,000 Guineas officially remained the second-best performance by a three-year-old in the 2006 season, beaten only by his win in the Queen Elizabeth II Stakes at Ascot.

In the Celebration Mile, George Washington finished third behind Caradak and Killybegs. He missed the break badly under new jockey Michael Kinane, starting 8 lengths behind Caradak and finishing one length behind him.

The day before his main seasonal target, the Queen Elizabeth II Stakes, heavy rain arrived and 14 mm of rain fell on Ascot racecourse. Half an hour before the race, much money came in to cement his place as favourite and he was sent off at odds of 13/8. Two pacemakers were deployed by Ballydoyle, and under jockey Michael Kinane, George Washington was victorious by a length and a quarter.

Breeders' Cup Classic 

A tilt at the Breeders' Cup Classic at Churchill Downs had been decided upon about two weeks before the event. Because George Washington was already a strong miler, it was believed that a victory in the Breeders' Cup Mile would do very little for his stud fee. Despite being by a predominantly turf sire in Danehill, his dam was Bordighera, who also foaled Grandera, a victor of three Group 1 races. Kinane was declared to ride the horse.

Before the final turn, George Washington approached the leaders. He came wide to make his challenge but was bumped by the eventual winner, Invasor, and lost momentum. Kinane reported that his stamina simply ran out.

Despite calls from Kinane and various members of the press for the horse to stay in training, he was officially retired and was due to stand at Coolmore's Ireland base for a fee of €60,000.

.

Fertility problems 

On 10 March 2007, it was reported that Coolmore had suspended George Washington's stud career due to fertility problems. The decision was taken to replace him at stud with Holy Roman Emperor, a three-year-old colt also by Danehill.

Return to training 

On 25 March 2007, it was announced that George Washington had returned to training at Aidan O'Brien's stable. He was initially entered for the Tattersalls Gold Cup in May, but his return to the racecourse eventually came in the Queen Anne Stakes at the Royal Ascot meeting at Ascot Racecourse on 19 June. He pulled hard going to the start in the early part of the race but eventually settled to finish fourth behind Ramonti.

His second race of 2007 came in the Eclipse Stakes at Sandown Park on 7 July. He finished third, one and a half lengths and a head behind Notnowcato and The Derby winner Authorized. Authorized.

Kieren Fallon then reunited with George Washington in the Group 1 Prix Du Moulin in September. The partnership finished third to the filly Darjina and Godolphin horse Ramonti.

George Washington was euthanised on the track at the request of his trainer following an open fracture to the cannon bone and both sesamoid bones in the right front fetlock. The accident occurred during the Breeders' Cup Classic at Monmouth Park on 27 October 2007 on very muddy dirt. According to Dr. C. Wayne McIlwraith, the on-call veterinarian, George Washington had cut off all blood supply to his ankle. All other races that day were incident free.

Career summary

Offspring 

A George Washington filly was born at the Irish National Stud on 4 February 2008. This foal, out of the mare Flawlessly (FR), sold for 280,000 Euros to Gildawn Stud at Goffs November Foal Sale on 21 November 2008. The filly was offered for sale again during Book 1 of the October Yearling Sale at Tattersalls, Newmarket, 6–8 October 2009. She was bought by Ross Doyle for 320,000gns on behalf of Julie Wood and went into training to Richard Hannon. The filly, named 'Date with Destiny' won on her debut at Newbury in July 2010 and in 2011 finished third in the Listed Lingfield Oaks Trial. Date With Destiny's daughter, Beautiful Morning, won the John Musker Fillies' Stakes in 2017 and the Group 3 Royal Whip Stakes in 2018.

Pedigree

References

External links
 DRF George Washington Suffers Fatal Injury
 

2003 racehorse births
2007 racehorse deaths
Horses who died from racing injuries
Cartier Award winners
Racehorses bred in Ireland
Racehorses trained in Ireland
Thoroughbred family 5-g
2000 Guineas winners